Roaix is a commune in the Vaucluse department in the Provence-Alpes-Côte d'Azur region in southeastern France.

Alice Colonieu lived at Roaix.

See also
Communes of the Vaucluse department

References

Communes of Vaucluse